King of Mahjong is a 2015 Singaporean-Malaysian Chinese New Year comedy film directed by Adrian Teh and starring Chapman To, Mark Lee, Michelle Ye and Venus Wong. The film was released on 19 February 2015 marked the first day of Chinese New Year.

Plot

Cast
 Chapman To as Fatt
 Mark Lee as Wong Tin-ba
 Michelle Ye as Ramona
 Venus Wong as Sassy Bai
 Adrian Teh
 Cheronna Ng as Deedee Cheung
 Richard Low
 Patricia Mok
 Dennis Chew
 Lenna Lim

Guest appearance
 Eric Tsang
 Tien Hsin
 Kingdom Yuen
 Lo Hoi-pang
 Mimi Chu
 Siu Yam-yam

Production
King of Mahjong was filmed in both Singapore and Malaysia.

Box office
When the film premiered in Malaysia on 19 February 2015, the film grossed RM$2.4 million at the box office after its first four days of release, leading the weekly box office. As of 6 March 2014, the film has grossed RM$3 million.

References

External links
 KING OF MAHJONG《麻雀王》電影預告片- 農曆新年隆重上映！IN CINEMAS THIS CNY!

2015 films
Singaporean comedy films
Malaysian comedy films
2015 comedy films
Films about gambling
2010s Cantonese-language films
Films set in Singapore
Films set in Malaysia
Films shot in Singapore
Films shot in Malaysia
Chinese-language Malaysian films
Chinese New Year films